Equilibrium is the sixth studio album by the American metal band God Forbid. The album was released on March 26, 2012, through Victory Records. This was the band’s final album before their split from 2013 to 2022, and their only album to feature rhythm guitarist Matt Wicklund.

Track listing

Credits

God Forbid
Byron Davis – lead vocals
Doc Coyle – lead guitar, backing vocals
John "Beeker" Outcalt – bass
Matt Wicklund – rhythm guitar
Corey Pierce – drums

Additional personnel
Mark Lewis - producer
Jason Suecof - producer
Jens Bogren - mixing, mastering

Charts

References

2012 albums
God Forbid albums
Victory Records albums
Albums produced by Jason Suecof
Albums produced by Jens Bogren
Albums produced by Mark Lewis (music producer)